Savennes may refer to the following places in France:

 Savennes, Creuse, a commune in the Creuse department
 Savennes, Puy-de-Dôme, a commune in the Puy-de-Dôme department